Albert Puigdollers Saperas (born 30 October 1980 in Granollers, Barcelona, Catalonia) is a Spanish retired footballer who played as a defensive midfielder.

External links

1980 births
Living people
Footballers from Granollers
Spanish footballers
Association football midfielders
Segunda División players
Segunda División B players
Tercera División players
FC Barcelona C players
FC Barcelona Atlètic players
Atlético Madrid B players
Atlético Malagueño players
Cultural Leonesa footballers
CF Badalona players
CF Gavà players
CE Sabadell FC footballers
Recreativo de Huelva players
Scottish Football League players
Cowdenbeath F.C. players
Catalonia international footballers
Spanish expatriate footballers
Expatriate footballers in Scotland
Spanish expatriate sportspeople in Scotland